Sergey Yuryevich Tetyukhin (born 23 September 1975) is a former Russian volleyball player. He was born in Fergana, Uzbekistan. He is 1.97 m tall, and plays as passer-attacker. Together with Samuele Papi and Sérgio Santos he is one of only three male volleyball players who have accumulated four Olympic medals in the course of their long sporting careers. Tetyukhin, however, has the distinction of being the only volleyball player in the world (male or female) with four Olympic medals who has all three types of those awards, including gold at London Olympics. He competed at six Summer Olympics, being the flag-bearer in 2016.

Awards

Individual
 1999 European Championship - Best Receiver
 2001 Order of Friendship
 2002 FIVB World Championship - Outside Hitter in Super Seven Selection
 2003 CEV Champions League - Most Valuable Player
 2009 Medal of the Order For Merit to the Fatherland
 2011 CEV Champions League - Best Server
 2012 Order of Honour Russia
 2014 CEV Champions League - Most Valuable Player
 2014 FIVB Club World Championship - Best Outside Spiker
 2016 Olympic Qualifier - Most Valuable Player
 2016 European Confederation - Volleyball Ambassador of the Year

Clubs

CEV Champions League
  2002/2003 - with Lokomotiv-Belogorie Belgorod
  2003/2004 - with Lokomotiv-Belogorie Belgorod
  2004/2005 - with Lokomotiv-Belogorie Belgorod
  2005/2006 - with Lokomotiv-Belogorie Belgorod
  2007/2008 - with Dynamo-Tattransgaz
  2010/2011 - with Zenit Kazan
  2013/2014 - with Belogorie Belgorod

FIVB Club World Championship
  Doha 2009 - with Zenit Kazan
  Belo Horizonte 2014 - with Belogorie Belgorod

CEV Cup
  1996/1997 - with Belogorie Belgorod
  2008/2009 - with Lokomotiv-Belogorie Belgorod
  2017/2018 - with Belogorie Belgorod

CEV Challenge Cup
  2001/2002 - with Lokomotiv-Belogorie Belgorod

National Championships
 1994/1995  Russian Championship, with Lokomotiv Belgorod
 1994/1995  Russian Cup, with Lokomotiv Belgorod
 1995/1996  Russian Championship, with Belogorie Belgorod
 1995/1996  Russian Cup, with Belogorie Belgorod
 1996/1997  Russian Championship, with Belogorie Belgorod
 1996/1997  Russian Cup, with Belogorie Belgorod
 1997/1998  Russian Championship, with Belogorie-Dynamo Belgorod
 1997/1998  Russian Cup, with Belogorie-Dynamo Belgorod
 1998/1999  Russian Championship, with Belogorie-Dynamo Belgorod
 2001/2002  Russian Championship, with Lokomotiv-Belogorie Belgorod
 2002/2003  Russian Championship, with Lokomotiv-Belogorie Belgorod
 2002/2003  Russian Cup, with Lokomotiv-Belogorie Belgorod
 2003/2004  Russian Championship, with Lokomotiv-Belogorie Belgorod
 2004/2005  Russian Championship, with Lokomotiv-Belogorie Belgorod
 2004/2005  Russian Cup, with Lokomotiv-Belogorie Belgorod
 2005/2006  Russian Championship, with Lokomotiv-Belogorie Belgorod
 2006/2007  Russian Championship, with Dynamo-Tattransgaz
 2006/2007  Russian Cup, with Dynamo-Tattransgaz
 2007/2008  Russian Championship, with Dynamo-Tattransgaz
 2008/2009  Russian Cup, with Lokomotiv-Belogorie Belgorod
 2009/2010  Russian Championship, with Zenit Kazan
 2009/2010  Russian Cup, with Zenit Kazan
 2010/2011  Russian SuperCup 2010, with Zenit Kazan
 2010/2011  Russian Championship, with Zenit Kazan
 2011/2012  Russian Cup, with Belogorie Belgorod
 2012/2013  Russian Championship, with Belogorie Belgorod
 2012/2013  Russian Cup, with Belogorie Belgorod
 2013/2014  Russian SuperCup 2013, with Belogorie Belgorod 
 2013/2014  Russian Championship, with Belogorie Belgorod
 2013/2014  Russian Cup, with Belogorie Belgorod
 2014/2015  Russian SuperCup 2014, with Belogorie Belgorod 
 2014/2015  Russian Championship, with Belogorie Belgorod
 2014/2015  Russian Cup, with Belogorie Belgorod
 2015/2016  Russian Championship, with Belogorie Belgorod

National Team

Senior Team
 1996  FIVB World League
 1997  FIVB World League
 1998  FIVB World League
 1999  FIVB World Cup
 1999  CEV European Championship
 2000  Olympic Games
 2000  FIVB World League
 2001  FIVB World League
 2001  CEV European Championship
 2002  FIVB World League
 2002  FIVB World Championship
 2003  CEV European Championship
 2004  Olympic Games
 2004  CEV European League
 2005  CEV European Championship
 2006  FIVB World League
 2007  FIVB World Cup
 2007  CEV European Championship
 2008  Olympic Games
 2008  FIVB World League
 2009  FIVB World League
 2011  FIVB World Cup
 2012  Olympic Games

Junior Team
 1994  CEV U21 European Championship
 1995  FIVB U21 World Championship

References

External links
 
 
 
 FIVB Profile
 Last Man Standing: Russian hero Sergey Tetyukhin

1975 births
Living people
Russian men's volleyball players
Volleyball players at the 1996 Summer Olympics
Volleyball players at the 2000 Summer Olympics
Volleyball players at the 2004 Summer Olympics
Volleyball players at the 2008 Summer Olympics
Olympic volleyball players of Russia
Olympic silver medalists for Russia
Olympic bronze medalists for Russia
People from Fergana
Olympic medalists in volleyball
Volleyball players at the 2012 Summer Olympics
Olympic gold medalists for Russia
Medalists at the 2000 Summer Olympics
Medalists at the 2012 Summer Olympics
Medalists at the 2008 Summer Olympics
Medalists at the 2004 Summer Olympics
Recipients of the Order of Honour (Russia)
Volleyball players at the 2016 Summer Olympics
VC Belogorie players
VC Zenit Kazan players